Scylla Mountain is a  summit in British Columbia, Canada.

Description

Scylla Mountain is located in the Battle Range of the Selkirk Mountains. Precipitation runoff from the mountain drains north to Houston Creek and south into headwaters of the Westfall River, which are both tributaries of the Duncan River. Scylla Mountain is more notable for its steep rise above local terrain than for its absolute elevation.

History
The peak was named in 1947 by Andrew J. Kauffman II and Norman Brewster, whereas the first ascent of the summit was made in August 1959 by a Dartmouth Mountaineering Club party. The mountain's toponym was officially adopted on June 9, 1960, by the Geographical Names Board of Canada, however, the location was officially corrected on October 3, 1973. This mountain's name refers to Scylla, a metamorphic monster in Greek mythology who lives on one side of a narrow channel of water, opposite her counterpart Charybdis. The two sides of the Strait of Messina are so close that sailors attempting to avoid Charybdis would pass dangerously close to Scylla and vice versa. Scylla is pronounced:  .

Climate

Based on the Köppen climate classification, Scylla Mountain is located in a subarctic climate zone with cold, snowy winters, and mild summers. Winter temperatures can drop below −20 °C with wind chill factors below −30 °C. This climate supports the Scylla Glacier on the west slope of the peak and a small unnamed icefield on the north slope.

See also
Geography of British Columbia

References

External links
 Scylla Mountain: Weather forecast

Two-thousanders of British Columbia
Selkirk Mountains
Kootenay Land District